The Indianapolis 500 Rookie of the Year is an annual award "presented to the driver who has performed with the most distinction among first-year drivers in the Indianapolis 500." Criteria includes "on-track performance in practice, qualifying and the race, media and fan interaction, sportsmanship and positive influence on the Indy 500." Sportsmanship is a drivers' relationship to fellow racers and fans, and media interaction is their availability to spectators and the press during the event. Voters are encouraged by the Indianapolis Motor Speedway (IMS) to treat each criterion "as the same as any other." Competitors who outperform in their equipment during qualifying and the race, as well as those who led laps but retired, are given leeway. The award is not always presented to the highest-finishing rookie, and it is not given if there are no rookie entrants. It has formerly been sponsored by Stark and Wetzel, American Fletcher National Bank, Bank One, Chase, and Sunoco.

The rules state that the driver must be a rookie who competes in qualifying and the race. Previous Indianapolis 500 racers and prize money winners are ineligible for the award at future events. According to earlier regulations, drivers were evaluated on their willingness to follow United States Auto Club regulations, mental attitude, willingness to listen to advice from experts, actions to improve the welfare and safety of other competitors, and their own performance in qualifying and the race. The term "appearance" was defined by officials in 1958 as a driver who paid for or took part in prize money for one of the race's 33 starting spots. They disqualified drivers who crashed before the start of the 1958 Indianapolis 500 from competing for the accolade the following year.

It was established before the 1952 Indianapolis 500 to reward rookie drivers for their performance in the race. Each year, after the race has ended, a small group of current and former media members, along with IndyCar Series and IMS officials, vote. They use a points-based voting system to choose their first and second choices. The winners' names are engraved on the Stark and Wetzel Rookie of the Year Award Trophy in the IMS Museum, and they receive $50,000 in cash and a cut glass trophy. The Herff-Jones Co. spent $6,000 to create the -tall trophy. It has an onyx base with sterling rest googles and a sterling plate mounted on a central walnut shaft. A sterling bar in the shape of IMS' official emblem (wings sprouting from a racing tire) makes up the trophy's head. It features the number 500 and a gold race car going through the middle numeral. Each year, after the race, the award is presented at the Victory Banquet in Indianapolis. Previous awards have included a plaque, a ring, and a year's worth of meat from Stark and Wetzel.

76 drivers have won the accolade in the 70 years that it has been awarded. The inaugural recipient was Art Cross in the 1952 race. It is typically given to one driver per year, but on five occasions it was awarded to two racers for their performance in a single race: Parnelli Jones and Bobby Marshman for the 1961 race, Rick Mears and Larry Rice in the 1978 event, Michael Andretti and Roberto Guerrero at the 1984 edition, Bernard Jourdain and Scott Pruett for the 1989 race, and Alex Barron and Tomas Scheckter in the 2002 event. American Lyn St. James became the first woman driver to win the award at the 1992 edition. Since then, two other women have won: Danica Patrick for the 2005 race and Simona de Silvestro after the 2010 event. Juan Pablo Montoya (the 2000 race), Hélio Castroneves (the 2001 event) and Alexander Rossi (the 2016 edition) are the three drivers who have won both the prize and the race in the same calendar year. The most recent winner was Jimmie Johnson in the 2022 race.

Since 1975, the American Dairy Association Indiana (ADA) has presented the Fastest Rookie of the Year award to the fastest rookie qualifier regardless of starting position or speed. The quickest rookie qualifier receives $10,000, a commemorative poster, and a plaque at the annual ADA Fastest Rookie Luncheon. The driver's name is also inscribed on the IMS Museum's permanent Fastest Rookie trophy. There have been 48 winners of the award. The first winner was Bill Puterbaugh in the 1975 race, and the most recent winner was Romain Grosjean at the 2022 edition.

Rookie of the Year winners

Statistics

Fastest rookie qualifier

Statistics

See also
 IndyCar Rookie of the Year

Notes

References
General
 
 
 

Specific

Rookies of the Year
Auto racing trophies and awards